The 1897 Villanova Wildcats football team represented Villanova University during the 1897 college football season.

Schedule

References

Villanova
Villanova Wildcats football seasons
Villanova Wildcats football